Cross That Line is the fourth album by British pop musician Howard Jones, released in March 1989. It featured two hit singles "The Prisoner" (#30 US) and "Everlasting Love" (#12 US), though neither of these singles nor the album itself were successful in Jones's native UK.

The album was produced by Jones with Ian Stanley, Chris Hughes, and Ross Cullum - all of whom had worked with Tears for Fears earlier in the 1980s.

The music video for "The Prisoner" was notably innovative at the time, mixing multiple photo and video editing tricks at a time when computer-based graphics effects were not widely in use.

The track Powerhouse was remixed by Danny D and released to clubs.

The album was remastered and released on CD (with a host of extra tracks) in 2012.

Track listing
All songs written by Howard Jones.
"The Prisoner" - 4:38
"Everlasting Love" - 4:16
"Powerhouse" - 3:26
"Last Supper" - 5:18
"Cross That Line" - 4:42
"Out of Thin Air" - 3:07
"Guardians of the Breath" - 7:34
"Fresh Air Waltz" - 3:59
"Wanders to You" - 5:08
"Those Who Move Clouds" - 5:46

Personnel 
 Howard Jones – vocals, keyboards (1, 2, 4, 7, 10), Fairlight guitar (3, 5, 7), Hammond organ (3, 8), drums (4, 8, 10), acoustic piano (5, 6, 8), flute solo (5), samples (7), Fairlight strings (8)
 Ian Stanley – keyboards (1, 2)
 Mike Roarty – Fairlight programming (1-10)
 Andy Ross – guitar (1, 2)
 Martin Jones (Howard's brother) – guitar (2), Wal bass (5-9)
 Phil Palmer – guitar (3, 5, 9), acoustic guitar (4)
 Steg – Ebow guitar (7)
 Chris Hughes – drums (1, 2)
 Trevor Morais – drums (3, 5, 9)
 Danny D – drum programming (3)
 Alan Hewitt – chainsaw (7)
 Simon Clarke – alto saxophone (3, 5, 9), flute (5, 9)
 Tim Sanders – tenor saxophone (3, 5, 9), soprano saxophone (5, 9), soprano sax solo (9)
 Peter Thoms – trombone (9)
 Roddy Lorimer – trumpet (3, 5), flugelhorn solo (5), flugelhorn (9)
 Steve Sidwell – trumpet (3)
 Sandy McLelland – additional vocals (2)
 Inga Humpe – vocals (3)
 Claudia Fontaine – backing vocals (5)
 Osheen Jones (Howard's son) – laughter (10)

Production 
 Tracks #1 & 2 produced and engineered by Ross Cullum, Chris Hughes and Ian Stanley.
 Tracks #3-10 produced by Howard Jones
 Tracks #3-10 recorded by Mike Roarty
 All songs mixed by Mike Roarty
 Drums on tracks #3, 5 & 9 recorded by Andy Scarth
 Mastered by Denis Blackman at Tape One Studios (London, UK).
 Photography – Simon Fowler and Brian Griffin

Charts

References

Howard Jones (English musician) albums
1989 albums
Albums produced by Ian Stanley
Albums produced by Chris Hughes (musician)